J. Grant Thiessen (born 1947) is a Canadian bibliographer and bookseller (Pandora's Books, BookIT Enterprises).  He has worked primarily in the area of science fiction.  His bibliographic fanzine, The Science Fiction Collector, has been collected into three hardbound volumes from Pandora's Books.

The most frequently referenced work from these volumes is the guide to the Ace Books sf doubles; books bound dos-à-dos. The non-double sf, fantasy, and horror titles were also listed. This bibliography appeared in the first issue of Science Fiction Collector.  Other paperback publishers whose output is documented by Thiessen includes Ballantine Books, Monarch Books, Curtis Books, and Lancer Books.  The volumes also contain individual author biographies; authors covered include James H. Schmitz, Jack Williamson, E. C. Tubb, A. E. van Vogt, and Charles L. Harness.

Thiessen also published "The Tanelorn Archives", a bibliography of Michael Moorcock, and has made many contributions to bibliographic reference works, magazines, and price guides, as well as producing several hundred book catalogs.

He was born in 1947 in Winnipeg, Manitoba, Canada.  He acquired his CMA (Certified Management Accountant) degree in 1973.  In 1977, he formally incorporated as Pandora's Books Ltd.

In 1995, Pandora's Books was an early retail entry on the internet.  The company was sold in 1999, and operated until 2020 under new management.

Grant continued to sell books and write computer software, as BookIT Enterprises Inc, until his retirement in early 2022.

External links
BookIT Enterprises Inc.
Pandora's Books

1947 births
Living people
Science fiction academics
Canadian science fiction writers
Canadian bibliographers
Canadian booksellers
Canadian accountants
Writers from Winnipeg
Mennonite writers